The Junior League World Series Canada Region is one of six International regions that currently sends teams to the World Series in Taylor, Michigan. The region's participation in the JLWS dates back to 1988.

Canada Region Provinces

Region Champions
As of the 2022 Junior League World Series.

Results by Province
As of the 2022 Junior League World Series.

See also

Canada Region in other Little League divisions
Little League
Intermediate League
Senior League
Big League

References

Canada
Baseball competitions in Canada
Recurring sporting events established in 1988